Rosita Fernández (January 10, 1918 – May 2, 2006) was a Mexican American Tejano music singer, humanitarian, and actress. She became a symbol of "Old Mexico" among European Americans in San Antonio, and was called the city's First Lady of Song by Lady Bird Johnson.

Early life 
Fernández was born in Monterey, Mexico to parents Petra San Miguel and Cesar Fernández. At the age of six Fernández and her family crossed the U.S. border into Laredo, Texas where she would receive her early education. Fernández talked about her family's immigration to the U.S in an interview, "The border didn't exist. It was very easy. My father and mother with so much family. What they charged then was five pesos per person and three-fifty or four for the little ones. It was much easier." A few years later the Fernández family would move to San Antonio, Texas while Rosita was at the age of nine. Rosita has stated that she got her love of music from hearing her mother sing to her as a child. Fernández joined her family band, Los Tres San Miguel at the age of nine—which consisted of her uncles (her mother's brothers). She previously only performed in front of her relatives before becoming the band's lead vocalist.

Music career 
In 1932, she became the star of a radio program on WOAI in San Antonio, and in 1933 recorded jingles for several radio commercials. In 1938, Fernández married Raúl A. Almaguer, and the couple had two children. In 1949, she performed on the first broadcast on WOAI television, and later became a regular on several shows. In her early beginnings of performance, it was mostly traveling shows such as La Carpa Cubana or stout Jackson’s El Teatro Carpa. Most of her shows were segregated little public presentations to Anglo Americans, the shows catered to Mexican American audiences. As technology progressed giving more different forms of entertainment in Movies and Radio. This opened for Rosita Fernandez to sing to Anglo Americans exposing them to a different kind of culture and music. She started her career singing Frito Lay commercial jingles, her first radio station was WOAI Radio a Spanish language, this gave her opportunities to perform on air. Rosita Fernandez’s voice and participation promoted Mexican Americans to purchase for beer and tortillas. Radio WOAI had broadcast musical performances, soap operas, & agricultural news. Rosita Fernandez as a singer gave the voice of Old Mexico, through her music it created imagery to aspects of the heritage of Mexico. She spoke through lyrics telling tales of such struggles like being an outsider in an Anglo dominated Texas. It also promoted Mexican American consumer goods; it also gave comfort to immigrants from Mexico to Texas. Rosita Fernandez’s music, voice and topics gave many newcomers a familiarity to what they were used to back in the homeland. The Mexican American culture weighted heavy in San Antonio through Rosita’s music.[1]

Acting career 
In her career and the production of more talkie films it opened more opportunities for Mexican American actresses. Since Rosita Fernandez pushed for more traditional roots for Mexican Heritage, promotion of Texas in more than just songs were on her agenda. Rosita Fernandez played minor roles in such movies like Giant (1956), The Alamo (1960), Sancho the Homing Steer (1962), and Seguin (1982). These films all tie back to Texas roots stemming Nationalism and pride for Texans/Tejanos. She starred in these films giving way for more inside the past of Texas and the culture of Mexican Americans. At the time these films were created most women in films were more Anglo Americans versus minority women. Rosita Fernandez had small roles in these films, but in her small roles she broke barriers in the United States. She was a woman of color acting in movies that were majority white actors/actresses but in her role, it was a big one for the Mexican American Community. (Rosita Fernández is not to be confused with the French actress of the same name, whose film career spanned 1955-2005.)[1]

Humanitarian work 
In her late career she became an Ambassador for the city of San Antonio, eventually writing a song titled the same thing. She challenged norms of the time creating another culture and perspective for Mexican American in Texas. Rosita Fernandez participated in Fiesta Noche Del Rio and Arneson River Theater. Instead of going completely mainstream with her music she remained locally to give the city more of an attraction and life. Rosita Fernandez gave the city more than just money for organizations by providing the city with romanticization of Mexican American Culture. She chose to career less mainstream for her love for the city of San Antonio, choosing money, international fame, and a life of luxury for promotion of Mexican American Heritage. Rosita chose to work as a middle-class performer over becoming an elite, this made her Lydia Mendoza more stardom. Rosita Fernandez was a conservatist for the cultures of San Antonio giving them more popularity and her songs created a deeper cultural root to Mexican Americans in Old San Antonio. She was called Old Mexico due to her representation of the culture; she also changed the yellow rose of Texas to Rosa San Antonio which gave Mexican American women a light. The yellow rose remained but Rosita Fernandez paved another rose for the city of Old Mexico.

Significance 
Rosita Fernandez is remembered strongly in San Antonio through her bridge named in her honor located on the Riverwalk. Rosita Fernandez’s investment of preserving San Antonio through her public singing in such events as Night in Old Mexico. She did more for the city of San Antonio commercially through her jingles and radio shows promoting Mexican American consumer items like food and supplies. She became a pioneer of corridos, and recorded romantica style ballads in the male-dominated genre of Tejano music. Another object that represented Rosita Fernandez was her China Poblana, it was a dress she wore throughout her career. It represented her travels through her career and worn at special occasions, it represented her heritage in Chicana culture. Rosita had many different dress each representing a significance of multiple performances in her career. The dresses became a symbol amongst women in the Chicana community used in other forms of art like today. They are used in art at Mexican American restaurants with men dressed in Mariachi outfits, her dress paved way for dresses used in musical performances like Ballet Folklorico. She started a trend that lasted for decades, it had spread across Texas. The China Poblana was a racist form, Rosita used it to represent feminism for Mexican American women as breaking through the norms. It traced back to mestizas and Criollos in pre-Mexico. Rosita Fernandez used the China Poblana for her break free from the traditions of Mexican American culture, she became more than just a woman performer but a symbol of breaking the norms. Fernández is part of the Smithsonian Collections at the National Museum of American History with her china poblana dress, which was made in the 1960s. Beginning in the 1950s, Fernandez performed in the annual summer show Fiesta Noche del Rio at the Arneson River Theater on the San Antonio River. She also was a featured performer each spring at the A Night in Old San Antonio event at San Antonio's Fiesta celebration. In 1967, San Antonio radio station KCOR recognized Fernandez as a "source of entertainment" at the riverwalk, convention centers, and for her public performances at charity events. The city renamed a bridge after her in 1982, which attracts 5.2 million visitors each year. Fernandez first retired from performing in 1982, but continued to make guest appearances into the 1990s.

Filmography

References

Sources 
 
 Vargas, Deborah R. “Rosita Fernandez” “Dissonant  Divas  in Chicana Music the Limits of La Onda”. University of Minnesota Press.  (2012)
 Vargas, Deborah R. “Rosita Fernandez: La Rosa de San Antonio” University of Nebraska Press. (2003)

External links
 
 New York Times obituary
 Interviews with Hattie Elam Briscoe, April 29, 1997, University of Texas at San Antonio: Institute of Texan Cultures: Oral History Collections, UA 15.01, University of Texas at San Antonio Libraries Special Collections.
Acosta, Teresa P. “Rosita Fernandez (1919-2006) Texas State Historical Association Handbook of Texas” https://www.tshaonline.org/handbook/entries/fernandez-rosita
ROSITA FERNÁNDEZ: San Antonio’s First Lady of Song : The Wittliff Collections (txstate.edu)

1918 births
2006 deaths
Tejano musicians
Singers from Monterrey
20th-century Mexican actresses
Actresses from San Antonio
Mexican child singers
Mexican women pop singers
Mexican film actresses
20th-century women philanthropists
Mexican television actresses
Hispanic and Latino American women singers
Singers from Texas
Spanish-language singers of the United States
American musicians of Mexican descent
Musicians from San Antonio
20th-century American singers
20th-century American women singers
20th-century philanthropists
Hispanic and Latino American musicians
Mexican emigrants to the United States
21st-century American women
American actresses of Mexican descent